Erick Elías Rabinovitz (born June 23, 1980) is a Mexican actor. Elías began acting with a screen debut in DKDA: Sueños de juventud (2000), followed by roles in Amigos x siempre (2000). He became known in the reality show Protagonistas de Novela (2003), where he was the winner. He participated in projects of the American network Telemundo, such as; Gitanas (2004), El cuerpo del deseo (2005), El Zorro, la espada y la rosa (2007), Betty en NY (2019) and 100 días para enamorarnos (2020). He got his first starring role in the telenovela Tormenta en el paraíso. From there followed roles as protagonists in Niña de mi corazón (2010), Ni contigo ni sin ti (2011), Porque el amor manda (2013), El color de la pasión (2014) and El hotel de los secretos (2016), the first series that Televisa produced for Blim.

Early life 
Elías was born in Guadalajara, Jalisco, Mexico, son of Cecilia Rabinovitz and Ricardo Elías Pessah. He has a brother named Alexis Elías. He studied arts and industrial design. In 2010 he married Karla Guindi, with whom he has two children, Penélope Elías Guindi (b. 2011) and Olivia Elías Guindi (b. 2013).

Acting career

Early career 
Before dedicating himself to the performance arts, he was part of a musical group called Tierra Cero. He made his acting debut in the 2000 telenovela DKDA: Sueños de juventud and Amigos x siempre. He became known in the 2003 reality show Protagonistas de Novela, where he turned out to be a winner. In 2004 he auditioned to be the main villain of the telenovela produced by Argos Comunicación for Telemundo Gitanas, where he played Jonás. After this project, he continued working for Telemundo with two more telenovelas, titled El cuerpo del deseo and El Zorro, la espada y la rosa. In 2007 he got her first starring role with Sara Maldonado in the telenovela Tormenta en el paraíso. In 2008, he was chosen by Carlos Moreno to participate also starring in the telenovela En nombre del amor remake of the 1991 telenovela Cadenas de amargura.

Elías has voiced Flint Lockwood in the Spanish-language version of Cloudy with a Chance of Meatballs and its sequel from Sony Pictures Animation. According to an interview, he has stated that his daughter, Penelope, inspired him to be the dubbing voice of Flint.

He provided the voice of Charro Negro, the main antagonist of the Mexican animated film, La Leyenda del Charro Negro released on 19 January 2018.

Filmography

Films roles

Television roles

Awards and nominations

References

External links

1980 births
Living people
Male actors from Guadalajara, Jalisco
Mexican Jews
Mexican male models
Mexican male film actors
Mexican male telenovela actors
Mexican emigrants to the United States
Singers from Guadalajara, Jalisco
21st-century Mexican singers
21st-century Mexican male singers